Hydra, or Ydra or Idra (Arvanitika: Nύδρα/Nidhra), and in antiquity Hydrea, is one of the Saronic Islands of Greece, located in the Aegean Sea between the Myrtoan Sea and the Argolic Gulf. It is separated from the Peloponnese by a narrow strip of water. In ancient times, the island was known as Hydrea (Ὑδρέα, derived from the Greek word for "water"), a reference to the natural springs on the island.

The municipality of Hydra consists of the islands Hydra (pop. 1,948, area ), Dokos (pop. 18, area ), and a few uninhabited islets, total area . The province of Hydra was one of the provinces of the Argolis and Corinthia prefecture from 1833 to 1942, Attica prefecture from 1942 to 1964, Piraeus prefecture from 1964 to 1972 and then back to Attica as part of the newly establishment Piraeus prefecture of Attica prefecture. Its territory corresponded with that of the current municipality. It was abolished in 2006. Today the municipality of Hydra is part of Islands regional unit of Attica region.

There is one main town, known simply as "Hydra port" (pop. 1,900 in 2011). It consists of a crescent-shaped harbor, around which is centered a strand of restaurants, shops, markets, and galleries that cater to tourists and locals (Hydriots). Steep stone streets lead up and outward from the harbor area. Most of the local residences, as well as the hostelries on the island, are located on these streets. Other small villages or hamlets on the island include Mandraki (pop. 11), Kamini, Vlychos (19), Palamidas, Episkopi, and Molos.

Name 
The name Hydra comes from ancient Greek ὕδρα (hydra), derived from the Greek word for "water", a reference to the natural springs on the island.
The local Arvanite name is attested in two variants: the common variant Nύδρα/Nidhra and the rare form Nidhriza or Hydriza. In Turkish it is known as Idra and in Ottoman Turkish: يدرا.

Transport, tourism and leisure

Hydra depends on tourism, and Athenians account for a sizable segment of its visitors. There is a passenger ferry service providing an alternative to hydrofoils that operates between Hydra Harbour to Metochi on the Peloponnese coast. Many Athenians drive to Metochi, leave their car in the secure car park, and take the 20-minute passenger ferry across to Hydra.

Rubbish trucks are the only motor vehicles on the island, since by law, cars and motorcycles are not allowed. Horses, mules and donkeys, and water taxis provide public transportation. The inhabited area, however, is so compact that most people walk everywhere.

Hydra benefits from numerous bays and natural harbours, and has a strong maritime culture. The island is a popular yachting destination and is the home of the Kamini Yacht Club, an international yacht club based in the port of Kamini.

In 2007, a National Geographic Traveler panel of 522 experts rated Hydra the highest of any Greek island (11th out of 111 islands worldwide), as a unique destination preserving its "integrity of place".

Captains' mansions
The Tsamadou mansion, on the left side as one enters the harbour, is now a Maritime Academy. The Tsamados family donated the mansion for the purpose of hosting the Greek Maritime Academy on their island. Another house, originally built for the Tsamados family on the hill overlooking the port was donated to the church to be used as a weaving school and production facility of textiles and carpets. The house now belongs to the Colloredo-Mansfeld family and became known as the Old Carpet Factory.

The Tombazis mansion is now part of the Athens School of Fine Arts, owned by University of Athens.

The mansions of Lazaros and George Kountouriotis, Boudouris, Kriezis, Voulgaris, Sachinis, and Miaoulis all contain collections of 18th-century island furniture. The descendants of Lazarus Kountouriotis donated his mansion to the Historic-Ethnologic Institute of Greece. Today, it operates as an extension branch of the National Museum of History.

Monasteries and the Cathedral
There are numerous churches and six Orthodox monasteries on the island. Two particularly noteworthy monasteries are Profitis Ilias, founded in the 10th century, and Ayia Efpraxia. Both are on a hill overlooking the main harbour.

The island's cathedral is the old Monastery of the Dormition of the Virgin and sits on the quayside in the town. The monastery contains the tomb of Lazaros Kountouriotis, the richest sea captain on Hydra, who gave his entire fortune to support the Greek War of Independence.

History

Pre-history, antiquity, Byzantine and Venetian era
There is evidence of farmers and herders from the second half of the third millennium BCE on the small, flat areas that are not visible from the sea. Obsidian from Milos has also been found. During the Helladic period, Hydra probably served as a maritime base for the kingdoms on the Greek peninsula. Fragments of vases, tools, and the head of an idol have been found on Mount Chorissa.

The large-scale Dorian invasion of Greece around the 12th century BCE appears to have depopulated the island. Hydra was repopulated by farmers and herders, perhaps sailing from the mainland port of Ermioni, in the 8th century BCE. Herodotus reports that toward the 6th century BCE, the island belonged to Ermioni, which sold it to Samos. Samos, in turn, ceded it to Troizina.

For much of its existence, Hydra stayed on the margins of history. The population was very small in ancient times and, except for the brief mentions in Herodotus and Pausanias, left little or no record in the history of those times.

It is clear that Hydra was populated during the Byzantine era, as vases and coins have been discovered in the area of Episkopi. However, it appears that the island again lost its population during the Latin Empire of Constantinople as its inhabitants fled the pirate depredations. On other islands, inhabitants moved inland, something that was essentially impossible on Hydra.

Albanian settlement and Arvanite community

Among local Arvanites, the first account about their settlement was written by Antonis Miaoulis, son of admiral Andreas Miaoulis, after the end of the Greek war of independence (1830). According to this local narrative, the Hydriots descend from the Albanians who directly left Albania as refugees in the 1460s due to persecution by the Ottoma Sultan Mehmed II. Historiographical research shows that the Albanians didn't settle in Hydra directly from Albania in the 15th century, but from the Peloponnese (Ermionida) due to conflicts in the region with the Venetians and the Ottomans. This first Albanian settlement occurred in the early 16th century and likely involved members of the same 1-2 clans. That made the island primarily Albanian in ethnic character. They created the modern town port and their presence was evident until the mid-20th century, when, according to T. Jochalas, the majority of the island's population was composed of immigrants from outside of Peloponnesus. In the 16th century, the island began to be settled also by refugees from the warfare between the Ottomans and Venetians. In the early 18th century, a last Arvanite movement from nearby areas settled in the island. Arvanitika Albanian was the language spoken by all Hydriotes. By the 19th century men had learned to speak Greek too, while women and children often didn't speak Greek. One of the reasons why Arvanitika was so enduring in Hydra as opposed to other islands which were part of the Albanian Aegean settlements was that the language was spoken and favored by the newly emerging Hydriot urban-merchant class. Even in the 20th century families of the local magnates like the Koundouriotis spoke Arvanitika in Hydra. Hydra was also an island where church liturgy was often held in local Arvanitika, which is a rare case as in most Orthodox Albanian communities  Greek was the language of liturgy even up to the early 20th century. The Arvanite community is still found on the island. Nowadays they are fully assimilated.

Ottoman era: period of commercial and naval strength

Hydra was relatively unimportant during much of the period of Ottoman rule. At the end of the sixteenth century there was a wave of migration consisting of big families from the Hellenic and Asia Minor regions to the island. Due to the infertile ground, the inhabitants turned to the sea. Its naval and commercial development began in the 17th century, and its first school for mariners was established in 1645. Apparently, the first truly Hydriot vessel was launched in 1657. However, the conflict between the Republic of Venice and the Ottoman Empire limited the island's maritime development until after 1718 and the Treaty of Passarowitz. From the 17th century on, Hydra began to take on a greater importance because of its trading strength.

During the first half of the 18th century, Hydra built the same kind of vessels as were built in the other Aegean Islands: the sachtouri of 15 to 20 tons, and the latinadiko of 40 to 50 tons. The Hydriots contented themselves with trading in the Aegean, going as far as Constantinople. A great change occurred in 1757 after they launched a vessel of 250 tons. The larger boats enabled Hydra to become an important commercial port. By 1771, there were up to 50 vessels from throughout Greece in the roads. Ten years later, the island had fitted out 100 vessels.

However, the Ottoman Empire and its policies constrained Hydra's economic success. Heavy tariffs and taxes limited the speed of development. The Ottoman administration limited free trade, permitting only Ottoman vessels to navigate the Dardanelles and the Bosphorus, and hence to have access to the Black Sea, its ports, and the trade in grain from their hinterlands. The Treaty of Küçük Kaynarca changed all this. Russia gained from the Ottoman Empire the right to protect the Empire's Orthodox Christians. The religious protection had a commercial corollary: the Hydriots began to sail under the Russian flag. The treaty also provided for free passage between the Aegean and the Black Sea. Hydra entered its commercial era. Hydriot vessels carried goods between Southern Russia in the east and the Italian ports of Ancona and Livorno in the west. From 1785 on, the Hydriot shippers began to engage in commerce, not just transport. Each vessel became its own small commercial enterprise, and trade with the Levant quickly began to depend on Hydra's vessels, though not without competition from those of Spetses and Psara.

The plague of 1792 killed a large part of the population, and many people moved away. As a result, the town was almost completely abandoned for a while. By the end of the 18th century, Hydra had again become quite prosperous, with its vessels trading as far as France, Spain, and even the Americas. Napoleon presented the island with the huge silver chandelier in the cathedral as a gesture of gratitude for the Hydriots' role in running the British blockade and so bringing food to France.

Greek War of Independence

 

In the 19th century, Hydra was home to some 125 boats and 10,000 sailors. The mansions of the sea captains that ring the harbor are a testament to the prosperity that shipping brought to the island, which, at the time of the Greek Revolution, had 16,000 inhabitants.

To begin with, Hydriots were far from unanimous in joining the Greek War of Independence. In April 1821, when Antonis Oikonomou expelled the governor, the Ottoman Nikolao Kokovila and proclaimed Hydra's adherence to the independence struggle, he met strong opposition from island leaders who were reluctant to lose the relatively privileged position they had under Ottoman rule. Oikonomou was imprisoned, hounded off the island and eventually his opponents sent assassins to chase and kill him in December 1821.

Still, Hydra eventually did join the cause of independence, and Hydra's contribution of some 150 ships, plus supplies, to fight against the Turks played a critical role. The Greek admiral Andreas Miaoulis, himself a settler on Hydra, used Hydriot fire ships to inflict heavy losses on the Ottoman fleet.  Eventually the fleet of Hydra - along with those of the other two naval islands of Psara and Spetses - were able to wrest control of the eastern Aegean Sea from the Ottoman Empire.

The Albanian-speaking seamen of Hydra and Spetses provided the core of the Greek fleet and leading members of the Greek government, among them a one wartime president. They in some cases used Albanian with each other to prevent others on their side from reading their correspondence.

Modern History
With the end of the revolution and the creation of the Greek state, the island gradually lost its maritime position in the Eastern Mediterranean, igniting an economic crisis that led to a period of hardship and unemployment. The main reason was that with the creation of the Greek state, Hydra's fleet lost the privileges that the Treaty of Küçük Kaynarca and the use of the Russian flag had given it. Another reason was that the traditional families who owned the majority of the fleet failed to foresee the benefits of participating in the steam ship revolution, which significantly cut shipping operational costs through reduced crew and independence of the winds, putting them at a disadvantage vis-á-vis the new shipping companies of Piraeus, Patras, and Syros. A third reason was that the new conditions made illegal activities such as piracy impossible. Once again, many inhabitants abandoned Hydra, leaving behind their large mansions and beautiful residences, which fell into ruin. The mainstay of the island's economy became fishing for sponge. This brought prosperity again until 1932, when Egypt forbade fishing along its coast.

Between 1941 and 1943, during the Axis occupation of Greece during World War II, there was famine on Hydra. It is estimated that some eight per cent of the population died of starvation. By the end of the World War II, the Hydriots were again leaving the island; many of them went abroad.

Historical population

Topography and ecology

The dominant geographic features of Hydra are its rocky hillsides, which are bare, pine forested valleys with the occasional farmhouse. The island was subject to a modern geologic study by Renz in 1955. Some of the later Permian limestone strata are rich in well-preserved fossils.

There are many types of wildflowers, including rare 'spentzes' or cyclamen and poppies. As well as pine trees, there are cypress and olive trees. Birds species include partridges, quails, and many migratory birds, which are subject to local hunting. Mammals include rabbits, feral cats, and goats.

Although the island's name is derived from ancient springs known to the Ancient Greeks, it is now almost dry. Hydra previously had wells, and three new wells have been found. Today, the island imports its water by boat from the Greek mainland. A new desalinization plant has been finished but is not in operation. Many local people store winter rainfall in cisterns beneath their houses to use later as drinking water.

A fire during the 2007 European heat wave destroyed much of the pine forest to the east of Hydra Port. However, the fire left untouched some forest above Kamini and at the west end of Hydra. The forest around Molos, Bisti, and Agios Nikolaos was also unaffected.

Climate
Hydra island has a hot-summer Mediterranean climate. Winters are mild and summers are hot with very high night temperatures.

Municipality of Hydra
The municipality of Hydra includes the following islands:

Cultural life

In the 1950s and 1960s Hydra was the adopted home of a community of expatriate artists that included celebrated Norwegian novelist Axel Jensen, Australian writers Charmian Clift and George Johnston, and Canadian singer-songwriter Leonard Cohen. Cohen wrote several of his better-known songs on Hydra, including "Bird on the Wire" and "So Long, Marianne", while living with Jensen's ex-wife, Marianne Ihlen. This period was depicted in the 2019 documentary film Marianne & Leonard: Words of Love, and Polly Samson's 2020 novel A Theatre for Dreamers. 

Next to Leonard Cohen's house is located the house of Panagiotis Tetsis, which is now working as a museum. 

In June 2009, the art collector Dakis Joannou opened a Hydra branch of a private art museum, the Deste Foundation, to show the work of established young artists.

The island hosts an annual conference on Rebetiko, a type of Greek urban folk music, in mid-October.

International relations

Twin towns — sister cities
The municipality of Hydra is twinned with:

  Ereğli, Turkey (since 1996)
  Bayonne, France (since 2008)

Notable people 

Laskarina Bouboulina (1771–1825) merchant, shipowner, naval heroine, admiral
Brenda Chamberlain (artist) (1912-1971) Welsh artist and writer
Charmian Clift (1923–1969), Australian novelist and writer
 Leonard Cohen (1934-2016), Canadian singer-songwriter, poet and novelist who spent his early song-writing career on Hydra with his girlfriend Marianne Ihlen.
Andrea Dimitry (1775–1852) Greek-American war hero, fought in the War of 1812. 
Dorotheus (1888–1957), Archbishop of Athens and All Greece
Photius Fisk (1809-1890) Greek-American abolitionist and U.S. Navy Chaplain
Axel Jensen (1932–2003) Norwegian author
George Johnston (1912–1970), Australian journalist, novelist and writer
Gikas N. Koulouras, shipowner, member of Parliament, founded and donated the Historical Museum and Archives of Hydra, founder and first President of the Greek Shipowners Association
Georgios Kountouriotis (1789–1858) merchant, shipowner, politician, Prime Minister of Greece
Lazaros Kountouriotis) merchant, shipowner. The biggest funder of the Greek War of Independence.
Pavlos Kountouriotis (1855–1935) naval hero, admiral and President of Greece
Panayotis Koupitoris (1821-1881), writer

Antonios Kriezis (1796–1865) merchant, shipowner, naval hero, admiral, Prime Minister of Greece
Marios Loizides (1928–1988) was a Greek visual artist.
Michalis Maniatis (1952) film and TV actor, producer, screen and book writer
Andreas Miaoulis (1768–1835), merchant, shipowner, naval hero, admiral
Athanasios Miaoulis (1815–1867) Prime Minister of Greece
Nikos Nikolaou (1909–1986), artist
Georgios Sachtouris, shipowner, admiral during the Greek war of Independence
Georgios Sachinis (1789–1864), merchant, shipowner, naval hero, admiral
Stavros Sachinis died in the Battle of Sphacteria (1825), holding off the Egyptian-Turkish landing force.
Panayiotis Tetsis (1925–2016), painter
Emmanouil Tombazis, merchant, shipowner, naval hero, admiral
Iakovos Tombazis (1782–1829) merchant, shipowner, naval hero, admiral

Rallou Manou, choreographer
Anastasios Tsamados (1774–1825), shipowner, admiral, Greek national hero, captain of the brig Aris, died heroically in the Battle of Sphacteria (1825), holding off the Egyptian-Turkish landing force.
Göran Tunström (1937–2000) Swedish author
Lily Venizelos (b. 1933), conservationist
Nikolaos Vokos (1854–1902), painter
Elena Votsi (b. 1964), jewellery designer
Nikolaos Votsis (1877–1931), naval hero and admiral
Dimitrios Voulgaris (1802–1878), merchant, shipowner, Prime Minister of Greece
Gordon Merrick (1916–1988), author
Kristina Colloredo-Mansfeld (b. 1940), artist
Ingeborg Beugel (b. 1960), journalist
Irene Kiskakes-Veliotes, mother of Greek-American R&B singer, Johnny Otis and his brother Ambassador Nicholas Veliotes

Books about or set on Hydra
 The Colossus of Maroussi, Henry Miller (1941)
 Peel Me a Lotus, Charmian Clift (1959)
 The Sea Change, Elizabeth Jane Howard (1959)
 A Rope of Vines: Journal from a Greek Island, Brenda Chamberlain (1965)
The Sleepwalker, Margarita Karapanou (1985)
 Clouds over Hydra, Charles Young (1996)
 Fugitive Pieces, Anne Michaels (1996)
 The Riders, Tim Winton (1996)
 Hydra and the Bananas of Leonard Cohen, Roger Green (2003)
 Rhubarbs from a Rock, David Fagan (2003)
 Hydra, Catherine Vanderpool (1980)
 Le Premier jour,  Marc Levy (2009)
 Travels with Epicurus, Daniel Klein (2012)
 Hydra vues privées / Private views, Catherine Panchout, Éditions Gourcuff Gradenigo (2015)
 Island of Cats – Hydra, Gabriela Staebler, Edition Reuss (2015)
 Beautiful Animals, Lawrence Osborne (2017)
So Long, Marianne: a Love Story, Kari Hesthamar (2017)
 Hydra. An Island and Its Architecture, Michael Loudon (2018)
 Forth Into Light, Gordon Merrick (1974)
 A Theatre for Dreamers, Polly Samson (2020)
 Half the Perfect World (writers, dreamers and drifters),Paul Genoni and Tanya Dalziell (2018)
When We Were Almost Young: Hydra through War and Bohemians, Helle Goldman (editor, compiler) (2018)
 Δε λες κουβέντα" (“Athens Undocumented”),  Makis Malafekas (2018)

Films shot on Hydra
 A Girl in Black (Greece 1956)
 Boy on a Dolphin (1957). Hydra was the setting for this Sophia Loren hit movie.
 Phaedra (1962)
 Island of Love (1963)
 Incense for the Damned (1970)
 The Blue Villa (Un Bruit Qui Rend Fou) (1995)
 Boat Trip (2002)
 Fugitive Pieces (2007)
 The Capsule (2012)
 Marianne & Leonard: Words of Love (2019)
 The Trip to Greece (2020)

Gallery

References

Further reading

External links

 
Municipalities of Attica
Populated places in Islands (regional unit)
Car-free zones in Europe
Provinces of Greece
Road-inaccessible communities of Europe
Arvanite settlements